Okanogan (US)  or Okanagan (Canada) may refer to:

People and regions
Okanagan Country, a divided region in British Columbia and Washington
Okanagan people, a Native American (USA) or First Nations (Canada) people, known as the Syilx in their own language
Okanagan language

Canada
Okanagan (also Okanagan Valley), a region of British Columbia
Okanagan Basin, watershed in British Columbia and Washington
Okanagan Lake, British Columbia, a lake forming the core of the region in British Columbia
Okanagan River (same as Okanogan River), river in British Columbia and Washington
Okanagan Valley (wine region), the wine region around Okanagan Lake
Okanagan Mountain Provincial Park, British Columbia (Okanagan Mountain is also a suburban area of Kelowna, British Columbia)
Okanagan Trail, 1858 trail to the Fraser Canyon Gold Rush from Oregon
Okanagan Highland, upland plateau area in British Columbia and Washington State
Okanagan Range, a subrange of the Cascade Range spanning the border between British Columbia and Washington State
Okanagan (electoral districts), current and historical federal and provincial electoral districts
Regional District of Okanagan-Similkameen, a regional district of British Columbia
Regional District of Central Okanagan, a regional district of British Columbia
Regional District of North Okanagan, a regional district of British Columbia

United States
Okanogan, Washington, a city in Okanogan County, Washington
Okanogan River (same as Okanagan River), in British Columbia and Washington; a tributary of the Columbia River
Okanogan County, Washington, a county in north-central Washington
Okanogan Complex fire, a group of wildfires in Okanogan county during August–September 2015
Okanogan–Wenatchee National Forest, Washington state
Fort Okanogan, a Pacific Fur Company outpost in Washington, established 1811 (North West Company from 1813, Hudson's Bay Company from 1821)

Other
Hiram F. "Okanogan" Smith (1829–1893), American settler in the Pacific Northwest